Samuel Ofori is a Ghanaian actor, director and movie producer.

Career 
He is the Chief Executive Officer of Two Eyes Films.

Filmography 

 Akurasi Burgers 1,2 & 3
 Fake London Boy
 The Devil Between My Legs
 Big Girls 1 & 2

References

External links 
 

Ghanaian male film actors
Living people
21st-century Ghanaian male actors
Year of birth missing (living people)